Gillian Brown may refer to:
 Gillian Brown (diplomat) (1923–1999), British diplomat
 Gillian Brown (linguist) (born 1937), British linguist
 Gillian Ruth Brown, British psychologist
 Gill Brown (born 1965), British Olympic hockey player